Laura Gil Collado (born 24 April 1992) is a Spanish basketball player for Valencia Basket and the Spain women's national basketball team. At club level, she has been on teams that won the 2011 EuroLeague, the 2021 EuroCup and three Spanish Leagues competitions. As a member of the Spain national teams, she has been a medallist in all the tournaments she has played in from 2007 to 2019: nine medals at youth level and seven medals at senior level. The last medal won was gold at the EuroBasket Women 2019.

Club career
Gil played as a junior in the Segle XXI project from 2008 to 2010, where young talents are developed from youth teams to the Spanish second tier. In 2010, she signed for one of the top teams in the league Perfumerías Avenida, winning the 2011 EuroLeague and the Spanish League. She spent the next five years in four different clubs, winning the 2014 league, going back to former club CB Avenida in 2016, where they won the double league-cup in 2017 and 2018.

EuroLeague and EuroCup statistics

National team
Gil started playing with Spain's youth teams at 15, winning a total of nine medals from 2007 to 2012. She made her debut with the senior team in 2013, when she was 21 years old. Up to 2021, she had 134 caps with 4.4 PPG:

  2007 FIBA Europe Under-16 Championship (youth)
  2008 FIBA Europe Under-16 Championship (youth) 
  2009 FIBA Europe Under-18 Championship (youth) 
  2009 FIBA Under-19 World Championship (youth)
  2010 FIBA Europe Under-20 Championship (youth) 
  2010 FIBA Europe Under-18 Championship (youth) 
  2011 FIBA Europe Under-20 Championship (youth) 
  2011 FIBA Under-19 World Championship (youth)
  2012 FIBA Europe Under-20 Championship (youth) 
  2013 Eurobasket
  2014 World Championship
  2015 Eurobasket
  2016 Summer Olympics
  2017 Eurobasket
  2018 World Championship
  2019 Eurobasket
 7th 2021 Eurobasket
 6th 2020 Summer Olympics

Notes

References

External links
 
 
 
 
 
 

1992 births
Living people
Spanish women's basketball players
Power forwards (basketball)
Basketball players at the 2016 Summer Olympics
Basketball players at the 2020 Summer Olympics
Olympic basketball players of Spain
Medalists at the 2016 Summer Olympics
Olympic silver medalists for Spain
Olympic medalists in basketball
Sportspeople from Murcia